Jennifer Klein may refer to:

Jennifer Klein (academic), American professor at Yale University
Jennifer Klein (footballer) (born 1999), Austrian footballer
Jennifer Klein (coach) (born 1984), American soccer coach